Zwolle is a city and municipality in the Northeastern Netherlands. It is the capital of the province of Overijssel and the province's second-largest municipality after Enschede with a population of 130,592 as of 1 December 2021. Zwolle borders on the province of Gelderland and is east of the river IJssel.

History 

Archaeological findings indicate that the area surrounding Zwolle has been inhabited for a long time. A woodhenge that was found in the Zwolle-Zuid suburb in 1993 was dated to the Bronze Age period. During the Roman era, the area was inhabited by Salian Franks.

The modern city was founded around 800 CE by Frisian merchants and troops of Charlemagne. Previous spellings of its name include the identically pronounced Suolle, which means "hill" (cf. the English cognate verb "to swell"). This refers to an incline in the landscape between the four rivers surrounding the city, IJssel, Vecht, Aa and Zwarte Water. The hill was the only piece of land that would remain dry during the frequent floodings of the rivers. Zwolle was established on that incline.

A document mentions the existence of a parish church dedicated to St Michael. That church, the Grote of Sint Michaëlskerk (St. Michael's church), was renovated in the first half of the 15th century and exists to this day. The church contains a richly carved pulpit, the work of Adam Straes van Weilborch (about 1620), some good carving and an exquisite organ (1721).

On 31 August 1230, the bishop of Utrecht granted Zwolle city rights. Zwolle became a member of the Hanseatic league in 1294, and in 1361 joined the war between the Hanseatic League and Valdemar IV of Denmark. In the 1370 Treaty of Stralsund that ended the war, Zwolle was awarded a vitte, a trade colony, in Scania, then part of Denmark. Zwolle's golden age came in the 15th century. Between 1402 and 1450, the city's Gross Regional Product multiplied by about six.

In July 1324 and October 1361, regional noblemen set fire to Zwolle. In the 1324 fire, only nine buildings escaped the flames.

Zwolle was also, with Deventer, one of the centers of the Brethren of the Common Life, a monastic movement.  from Zwolle, on a slight eminence called the Agnietenberg, (hill of St Agnes), once stood the Augustinian convent in which Thomas à Kempis spent the greatest part of his life and died (in 1471).

At least as early as 1911, Zwolle had a considerable trade by river, a large fish market, and the most important cattle market in the Netherlands after Rotterdam. The more important industries comprised cotton manufactures, iron works, boat-building, dyeing and bleaching, tanning, rope-making, and salt-making.

In World War II, Zwolle was single-handedly liberated from the Germans by French-Canadian soldier Léo Major. He was made an honorary citizen of Zwolle in 2005 and a street is named after him, Leo Majorlaan.

In 2004, Zwolle's De Librije restaurant was honored with 3 stars by Michelin Guide; as of 2018, it is one of only three restaurants so honored in the entire country.

Blauwvingers
Citizens of Zwolle are colloquially known as Blauwvingers (Bluefingers). This dates back to 1682, when the St Michael's church tower collapsed. The authorities were strapped for cash and saw no option but to sell the church bells to neighbouring city Kampen. To make sure that Kampen would not make too much profit from the deal, the local authorities asked a high price for the church bells. Kampen accepted, yet after the arrival of the bells it became clear, they were too damaged to be played. In revenge, Kampen paid in copper coins of four duiten (the equivalent of two-and-a-half cents). Zwolle distrusted Kampen and wanted to be sure they truly paid the entire price. After the rigorous counting of this vast amount of money, their fingers had turned blue from the counting of money.

Geography

Besides the Grote of Sint Michaëlskerk (St. Michael's church), the latter which houses a majestic Baroque organ built by Arp Schnitger, there are several other historic monuments in Zwolle. The Roman Catholic Onze Lieve Vrouwe ten Hemelopneming-basilica (Our Lady of the Assumption) dates back to 1399. The church tower, called Peperbus (pepperpot), is one of the tallest and most famous church towers in the Netherlands. The modernized town hall was originally built in 1448.

Mention should also be made of the Sassenpoort (one of the old city gates), the city walls, the Mosterdmakerstoren (mustard makers' tower)(the complex where local mustard used to be made), a guild-house (1571), the former provincial government offices, a Dominican monastery, and on the Melkmarkt, two museums; the Stedelijk Museum Zwolle of antiquities and natural history, and the Vrouwenhuis. Museum de Fundatie, the fine art museum of the province of Overijssel, is hosted in the former Justice Hall on Blijmarkt Square.

In the western part of the city, west of the railway station, there is a quarter of Art Nouveau buildings, concentrated mostly on Koningin Wilhelminastraat, Prinses Julianastraat, and Prins Hendrikstraat. These three-store living houses were built in 1900s by various Dutch architects. Eleven of the buildings are protected by the Dutch government (rijksmonumenten).

The Broerenkerk church was part of the Dominican monastery founded in 1465. The monastery was closed in 1580 and the monks were expelled. From 1640 until 1982 the church was used for Protestant services. After a restoration in 1983–1988 it has been used for cultural events and it is now a bookstore.

Image gallery

Notable residents
See also People from Zwolle
Arts, culture, entertainment and the media
 Willem Victor Bartholomeus (1825–1892), organist and conductor
 Hein Boele (born 1939), actor, Dutch voice of Elmo
 Jonnie Boer (born 1965), chef with three Michelin stars
 Gerard ter Borch (1617–1681), painter
 Gerard ter Borch the Elder (1583–1662), painter
 Moses ter Borch (1645–1667), painter
 Tooske Breugem (born 1974), television host actress
 Herman Brood (1946–2001), painter/rock star
 Funda Eryiğit (born 1984), Turkish actress
 Willem Grasdorp (1678–1723), painter
 Aleida Greve (1670–1742), painter
 Anna Cornelia Holt (1671–1692), painter
 Sophia Holt (1658–1734), painter
 Antonina Houbraken (1686–1736), draughtswoman 
 Marnix Kappers (1943–2016), actor
 Thomas à Kempis (c. 1380–1471), canon and mystic
 Master I. A. M. of Zwolle (c. 1440–1490), engraver
 Ton Koopman (born 1944), a conductor, organist, and harpsichordist
 Yuri Landman (born 1973), experimental musical instrument builder, comic book artist
 Cornelia van Marle (1661–1698), painter
 Michael Minsky (1918–1988), singer and conductor
 Leonard van Munster (born 1972), artist
 Opgezwolle (since 2001), rap crew
 Jan Vayne (Jan Veenje) (born 1966), pianist
 Charlotte Wessels (born 1987), former singer for Delain
 Aleijda Wolfsen (1648–1692), painter

Authors
 Eef Brouwers (born 1939), journalist and former head of the Netherlands Government Information Service
 A. den Doolaard (1901–1994), author
 Rhijnvis Feith (1753–1824), author
 Everhardus Johannes Potgieter (1808–1875), author

Business
 Willem Jan van Dedem (1776–1851), landowner and founder of the canal and town of Dedemsvaart

Religion
 Johannes Busch (1399–c. 1480), church reformer and provost of the Augustinian monastic order
 Andreas Ignatius Schaepman (1815–1882), Archbishop of Utrecht
 Alanus de Rupe (1428–1475), Roman Catholic theologian and Dominican promotor of the rosary

Politics
 Laurens Jan Brinkhorst (born 1937), former Minister of Economic Affairs
 Joan van der Capellen tot den Pol (1741–1784), role in the Batavian Republic
 Wybo Fijnje (1750–1809), Mennonite minister, publisher, exile, coup perpetrator, politician
 Willem Johan Lucas Grobbée (1822–1907), Minister of Finance from 1883 to 1885
 Johannes van Heerdt tot Eversberg (1829–1893), former governor of Suriname and Curaçao
 Piet Kasteel (1901–2003), ambassador and former governor of Curaçao
 Johan Rudolf Thorbecke (1798–1872), Prime Minister of the Netherlands (1849/1853, 1862/1866, 1871/1872)

Sports
 Jeroen Dubbeldam (born 1973), 2000 Olympic Equestrian champion
 Marten Eikelboom (born 1973), hockey player
 Maarten Grobbe (1901–1961), football player
 Martin Haar (born 1952), former football defender and current trainer
 Rinus Israël (born 1942), former football player and current scout
 Ron Jans (born 1958), former football player and current coach
 Bert Konterman (1971), football player
 Hennie van Nee (1939–1996), football player
 Eric Pierik (born 1959), field hockey player
 Johnny Rep (born 1951), football player
 Piet Schrijvers (1946–2022), football player
 Johannes Smeekens (born 1987), Olympic speedskater
 Jaap Stam (born 1972), former football player and current coach
 Gerrit Voges (1932–2007), football player
 Peter Wessels (born 1978), tennis player

Science
 Christianus Carolus Henricus van der Aa (1718–1793), Secretary of the Royal Holland Society of Sciences and Humanities
 Thomas Joannes Stieltjes (1856–1894), mathematician, civil engineer and politician
 Derk-Jan Dijk (Born 1958), Researcher of sleep and circadian rhythms

Educational institutions 
Zwolle is home to several universities and colleges:
 Artez
 Christelijke Hogeschool Windesheim
 
 
 Landstede Zwolle
 
 
 
 
 Windesheim Honours College

Transport

Road transport
Zwolle is a hub in the national highway network, and gateway to northern Netherlands. This is reflected in the high traffic volumes in and around the city. The A28 serves Zwolle with 4 exits, and runs from Utrecht to Groningen. It is being widened to 8 lanes across the IJssel River and 6 lanes from Zwolle to Meppel in 2010 and 2011. The motorway initially opened between 1964 and 1970. Another motorway, the A50, interchanges with A28 just west of the city, offering a route for southbound traffic to Apeldoorn and Eindhoven.

The N35 highway starts in Zwolle, where it forms the eastern section of the ring road of Zwolle, it runs as a non-motorway to Almelo and continues to Enschede as A35 motorway. The ringroad is mainly a 4-lane road, with numerous traffic lights. It forms a full ring, and also exists out of the N337 highway that runs to Deventer. Other sections of the ring road are not numbered. Parts of the ring road were widened to six lanes in 2010. Other numbered highways running from Zwolle are N331 to Hasselt, N758 to Nieuwleusen, N340 to Ommen and N764 to Kampen.

Bridges
Due to nearby rivers, there are several major bridges in and around Zwolle. The most important bridge is the IJssel Bridge where the A28 motorway runs across. It was completed in 1970 and carries over 125.000 vehicles per day. Adjacent to this bridge is the older IJssel Bridge, which opened in 1930 and was destroyed twice during World War II. A third IJssel Bridge is the railway bridge (called Hanze boog) which carries the railway line from Zwolle to Amersfoort, and from 2012, to Lelystad. There are several bridges across the Zwarte Water River, including two 4-lane bridges, a 2-lane bridge, and a bus/bicycle bridge. There is also a bridge across the Vecht, which carries A28 motorway. Another local bridge is adjacent to this bridge. A third bridge carries rail traffic to Leeuwarden and Groningen. Numerous local bridges exist around the historic city center.

Rail transport
 Zwolle railway station

The first train in Zwolle arrived on 6 June 1864. Today the city has rail connections in eight directions (viz. Kampen, Leeuwarden, Groningen, Emmen, Enschede, Arnhem/Nijmegen, Lelystad/Amsterdam, and Amersfoort).

The rail connection with Amsterdam via Lelystad – the Hanzelijn – is operational since December 2012.

The second station, Zwolle Stadshagen, was opened on 15 December 2019.

Water transport
Zwolle is located on or near three rivers (Zwarte Water, Vecht, and IJssel), several canals (the now disused Willemsvaart, Nieuwe Vecht and Overijssels Kanaal and the modern Zwolle-IJssel Kanaal). There are some water-related industries in Zwolle, mainly in the Voorst industrial area.

International relations

Twin towns—sister cities
Zwolle is currently twinned with:
  Lünen, Germany

In the past, Zwolle had partnerships with:
  Érsekhalma, Hungary
  Rutobwe, Rwanda
  Vologda, Russia
  Kaliningrad, Russia

References

Literature

External links

Official website

 
Cities in the Netherlands
Members of the Hanseatic League
Municipalities of Overijssel
Populated places in Overijssel
Provincial capitals of the Netherlands
Salland